Boykin is an unincorporated community in Marlboro County, South Carolina, United States.

References

Unincorporated communities in South Carolina
Unincorporated communities in Marlboro County, South Carolina